Mario Hispanus (died 1532) was a Roman Catholic prelate who served as Bishop of Salpi (1523–1532).

Biography
On 16 March 1523, Mario Hispanus was appointed during the papacy of Pope Adrian VI as Bishop of Salpi.
On 22 February 1524, he was consecrated bishop by Vincenzo de Andreis, Bishop Emeritus of Otočac, with Lorenzo Boschetti, Archbishop of Bar, and Leonardo Buccuto, Titular Archbishop of Nazareth, serving as co-consecrators. 
He served as Bishop of Salpi until his death in 1532.

References

External links and additional sources
 (for Chronology of Bishops)
 (for Chronology of Bishops)

16th-century Italian Roman Catholic bishops
Bishops appointed by Pope Adrian VI
1532 deaths